is a 2002 third-person shooter video game developed and published by Red Entertainment (Sega in North America and Activision in Europe) for the PlayStation 2. Gungrave follows its main character through a variety of stages on a path of revenge.

While the gameplay received moderate reviews, Gungrave received acclaim for the character designs provided by series creator Yasuhiro Nightow (Trigun) and mechanical designs provided by Kōsuke Fujishima (Oh My Goddess! series, You're Under Arrest series, Sakura Wars series). Both artists' respective styles helped give the game a distinct feel, which (along with fan support) helped Gungrave translate from a video game to an anime series as well as a video game sequel for the PlayStation 2 entitled Gungrave: Overdose in 2004. Cinematics were provided by Ikusabune Co., Ltd., which developed the sequel with Red Entertainment's supervision.

Gameplay
As a third-person shooter, Gungrave focuses on combat. The player advances through hallway-like stages, but has a free range of motion in these areas. The player confronts wave after wave of fighters en route to an end-level boss. Combat varies between gunplay with enemies at a distance and simple melee combat at close range, and the game rates the amount of flair the player uses to destroy everyone and everything in sight.

Players control Beyond the Grave, who is equipped with a damage-absorbing energy shield that can absorb a large amount of damage in addition to his life bar. This shield appears as a blue bar alongside Beyond the Grave's life bar in the game's heads-up display. When the shield is fully depleted, the player is highly vulnerable and further damage reduces the character's health level rapidly. However, the shield will recharge fully if no damage is sustained for a brief period of time.

By performing well during stages, the player can unlock special attacks such as machine guns or rockets launched from the coffin on Beyond the Grave's back. These can be used by charging the beat meter which is represented by a skull on the top left corner of the game's heads-up display. To build the beat meter, Beyond the Grave must perform combos sometimes numbering in hundreds of hits (destroying enemies or practically anything in the game environment). Strategy is required in setting up combos that are as long and devastating as possible, which helps to carry on the over-the-top action of the game.

Stages and some important events within stages are separated by anime cutscenes featuring art by Nightow. This is where the game's story takes place. Characters are expanded on and the player is given a back-story that is not obvious through gameplay alone.

Story

Setting
The game takes place in an unknown city that is controlled by the Millennion organization. The city is overrun by crime and a mysterious drug known as seed. The story follows Grave as he sets out on a course for revenge against the man who killed him, his former best friend and colleague from Millenion, Harry Macdowell.

Stages in the game are presented as missions issued by Dr. T, and follow Grave as he hunts down the boss of that stage.  Settings include a bar, a lab, the subway, and even a traditional Japanese dojo set atop a sky scraper.  These environments are complemented or contrasted by the urban environment that surrounds them.

Plot

The game opens with the young girl dragging an oversized attaché case toward a warehouse with difficulty. "Bloody" Harry Macdowell has just carried out a coup against Big Daddy, the leader of the Millennion organization, and his daughter Mika needs to find someone that can protect her and stop Harry's mad plans. The occupants of this warehouse include a kindly looking old doctor, and a man with a notable scar on his face. Mika arrives, and the man with the scar claims the contents of the case: two massive handguns. That man is revealed to be the game's title character Grave, and now that he is armed he can start his mission.

Gungrave first approaches its stages as a series of missions issued by Dr. T, first to gather information on the current makeup of Millennion from a low-level street gang, and next destroying a research facility that creates Harry's undead soldiers. In the third stage, while attempting to pump information from an informant, Grave comes into contact with the leadership of the Millenion organization—once friends and allies that he now faces as enemies. Each have used the research Harry supported to give themselves inhuman powers. From here on, Grave is hounded by each member as he makes his way to Harry's tower at the heart of the city.

As the player progresses, the game uses anime cutscenes to reflect on the history of young Brandon and Harry, gradually bringing the pair's back story into focus. Close friends, the two had both become lieutenants in the Millennion organization, working directly under Big Daddy, the group's leader. Brandon shared a bond with Big Daddy and some flashbacks show the two sharing more of a father-son relationship. Brandon even let Big Daddy marry the woman he loved so that she could find a better life, but the two remained close. Not content with the power he had been given, Harry asked Brandon to help him kill Big Daddy so that he could take over. When Brandon refused, Harry shot his friend in the left eye, killing him. Fifteen years later, Harry carried out his coup. His actions as leader inspired Dr. T to revive Brandon who was the only person capable of stopping Harry. Dr. T's connection to all of this is not made clear, but he often makes comments that indicate some connection to Brandon's former life.

Grave picks apart the leadership of Millennion to make his way to Harry. At the top of the tower that Harry uses as a headquarters, it is revealed that Big Daddy still lives in the form of a twisted monster. Harry forces Grave to fight his creation, and following the final battle, Harry accepts his defeat graciously and allows his friend to kill him.

With Harry defeated, Mika's protection becomes Grave's only concern, and to keep his promise to Big Daddy of protecting the family, Grave protects Mika while they drive away from this tragedy.

Development
The game was inspired by multiple action films, most notably those by John Woo. The gameplay was developed in order to be unique rather than a typical action game. Character designer Nightow was attending a convention in the United States and was approached by Red Entertainment during conception of the game which highly influenced their title.

Reception

The game received "mixed" reviews according to the review aggregation website Metacritic.

Sequels 
Two years later, Gungrave: Overdose was released and adds new playable characters to the series and a new story.

In 2017, Korean developers Iggymob and Blueside, under the supervision of Red Entertainment, revived the Gungrave series and released Gungrave VR for the PlayStation VR in late 2017 in Japan and late 2018 in North America and Europe. Gungrave VR serves as a prologue to a new sequel titled, Gungrave G.O.R.E (Gunslinger of REsurrection), which was released on November 22, 2022 for PlayStation 4, PlayStation 5, Xbox Series X/S, Xbox One, and PC.

References

External links
 Japanese, English, Official Japanese website

 
2002 video games
Activision games
Neo-noir video games
PlayStation 2 games
PlayStation 2-only games
Red Entertainment games
Science fiction video games
Sega video games
Third-person shooters
Video game franchises introduced in 2002
Video games with cel-shaded animation
Video games scored by Tsuneo Imahori
Video games adapted into television shows
Video games developed in Japan